Bernhard "Bernd" Heinemann (born 19 June 1949) is a former West German male canoeist who was world champion in Canadian C1 at senior level at the Wildwater Canoeing World Championships.

Biography
Heinemann participated at one edition of Olympic Games in canoe slalom in Munich 1972, where he was 16th it the C1 final.

Achievements

References

External links
 

1949 births
Living people
German male canoeists
Canoeists at the 1972 Summer Olympics
Olympic canoeists of West Germany